Mark Reed (born February 19, 1969) is an American professional stock car racing driver. He has raced in the NASCAR Winston Cup Series. He is the father of fellow driver Ryan Reed.

Motorsports career results

NASCAR
(key) (Bold – Pole position awarded by qualifying time. Italics – Pole position earned by points standings or practice time. * – Most laps led.)

Winston Cup Series

References

External links
 

1969 births
NASCAR drivers
Living people
Racing drivers from Bakersfield, California